Rukiye Yıldırım (born February 12, 1991 in Ankara) is a European champion Turkish taekwondo practitioner competing in the finweight division. She is a graduate student in the School of Sports science at Selçuk University in Konya.

She began with Taekwondo in 2002 in Kanka Taekwondo S.K. in Ankara, where she is coached by Hızır Pınaroğlu. She is representing her country at international events since 2007.

Rukiye Yıldırım won a bronze medal at the 2011 World Taekwondo Championships held in Gyeongju, South Korea. She is the gold medalist of 2010 European Taekwondo Championships in finweigth.

She won the silver medalist in the Flyweight (49kg) division at the 2013 Mediterranean Games held in Mersin, Turkey.

References

External links
 

Living people
1991 births
Sportspeople from Ankara
Turkish female taekwondo practitioners
Turkish female martial artists
European Games competitors for Turkey
Taekwondo practitioners at the 2015 European Games
European champions for Turkey
Mediterranean Games silver medalists for Turkey
Competitors at the 2013 Mediterranean Games
Universiade medalists in taekwondo
Competitors at the 2018 Mediterranean Games
Mediterranean Games gold medalists for Turkey
Mediterranean Games medalists in taekwondo
Universiade silver medalists for Turkey
World Taekwondo Championships medalists
European Taekwondo Championships medalists
Medalists at the 2011 Summer Universiade
Medalists at the 2015 Summer Universiade
Taekwondo practitioners at the 2020 Summer Olympics
Olympic taekwondo practitioners of Turkey
Selçuk University alumni
Islamic Solidarity Games medalists in taekwondo
Islamic Solidarity Games competitors for Turkey
21st-century Turkish women